The People's Fair is an annual event, held in early June, in Civic Center Park in Denver, Colorado, United States It is sponsored by Capitol Hill United Neighborhoods (CHUN).

The People's Fair is one of several free events held annually in Denver. The first People's Fair was held in 1972 at Morey Junior High School (now Morey Middle School), with 2,000 in attendance. Within five years, the fair had outgrown its home and moved to East High School. In 1987, the fair moved to its current home, Civic Center Park, between the Colorado State Capitol and the City and County Building.

The fair has about 500 vendor booths. Some sell food, but the focus of the juried event is on arts and crafts. CHUN describes it as "Colorado's Premier Arts and Crafts Festival". Throughout the event, several bands perform on stages, and carnival rides are set up in one portion of the fair's grounds.

Part of the mission of the People's Fair is to fund community non-profit organizations. This is accomplished via the beverage booths, staffed by volunteers whose respective organizations receive a portion of the profits from sales. 

No fair was held in 2019–20.

Notes

External links
 Official site

Tourist attractions in Denver
Summer festivals
Festivals in Denver
Cultural festivals in the United States